Hindu Swayamsevak Sangh is a non-profit, social, educational, and cultural organization of the Hindus living outside India. It was founded in 1940s in Kenya, it is currently active in 156 countries and estimates 3289 branches.

History 
Two volunteer members of the Rashtriya Swayamsevak Sangh (Swayamsevaks) that had settled in Kenya in the 1940s and started a shakha (branch).  Since such shakhas were not on 'national' (rashtriya) soil, they were renamed as the branches of Bharatiya Swayamsevak Sangh, later Hindu Swayamsevak Sangh (HSS).  RSS Pracharaks Bhaurao Deoras and others spent several years abroad to develop the organisation. During the Emergency RSS was banned in India and, consequently, sent its organisers abroad to seek support and carry out activism.

HSS in the United Kingdom was established in 1966, and shakhas were established in cities like Birmingham and Bradford.

In North America, the HSS gave the lead to the sister organisation Vishwa Hindu Parishad (VHP, World Hindu Council), which was founded in Canada in 1970 and in the United States in 1971. The HSS followed in its wake.

Australia 
The HSS organisation in Australia, as elsewhere, says that its focus is on the country in which it is based and that it does not send money to India. It claims to be "ideologically inspired by the RSS vision of a progressive and dynamic Hindu society that can deal with its internal and external challenges, and contribute to the welfare of the whole world". Aside from providing links to the Rashtriya Swayamsevak Sangh (RSS), they also have links with organisations such as the Vishwa Hindu Parishad and the Hindu Youth Network. The professed aim is to raise awareness in matters relating to Hindus but support no specific political party or candidate.

Kenya 
HSS Kenya was started in Nairobi on 14 January 1947 by Jagadish Chandra Shashtri with his colleagues. It was originally known as Bhartiya Swayamsevak Sangh. Since then it has spread throughout Kenya with Shakhas operational in Mombasa, Nakuru, Kisumu, Eldoret, and Meru. HSS in Kenya also runs a socio-cultural-religious organisation of Hindus by the name of Hindu Religious Service Centre (HRSC). It was started in Nairobi in 1947.

Liberia 
HSS Liberia was started in Monrovia on 29 October 2017.

During the COVID-19 pandemic on July 28, 2021, the HSS Liberia and the Red Cross provided food aid to Liberian people for the country's independence day.

Nepal 
The HSS was established in Nepal around 1992 by a group of Nepali students who were influenced by leaders of the Hindu nationalist RSS while studying in India. The two bodies share a similar Hindutva ideology. Their presence is particularly prevalent in the Terai region and they have regimented programs of education, dissemination of ideology and exercise as elsewhere in the world.

The Nepali HSS has been among several groups campaigning for a reversal of Nepal's 2006 decision to become a secular state after years of being ruled by a Hindu royal family. They say that the king had not favoured Hindus, that the decision was engineered by anti-Hindu groups, included communists and missionaries, and that in any event, it was unnecessary because there had been no persecution of religious minorities under the previous system. Among their demands has been that only Hindus should be appointed to high official posts.

United Kingdom 
HSS in the United Kingdom was established in 1966. 
On 18 February 2015, the Charity Commission for England and Wales announced that it was opening an investigation into HSS and two other organisations that were featured in  ITV's Exposure programme. The broadcast showed a teacher at a HSS summer camp telling children that "the number of good Muslims 'can be counted on one finger'" and that "to destroy Hindu history is the secret conspiracy of the Christians". 

The Charity Commission conducted an inquiry into the allegations and published a report on 2 September 2016. The inquiry found that there was mismanagement by the trustees who had failed to comply with their duties under charity law (page 4). It accepted the trustees' testimony that the teacher was a 'volunteer' and did not find evidence that the views expressed the teacher were "endemic or systematic in the charity and its activities" (page 6). The Commission also found that there was no evidence of any formal links between the RSS and HSS (page 7).

United States 
In the US, the HSS registered as a tax-exempt 501(c)(3) non-profit organization in 1989.

Presence elsewhere 
The RSS announced in 2014 that there were plans to establish HSS chapters in countries such as Denmark, Germany, Finland, France, Italy, the Netherlands, and Norway. It claimed that the two organisations worked closely together and shared a similar ideology but were not as one.

References

Citations

Bibliography

External links 

 

Sangh Parivar
Charities based in New Jersey
Charities based in London
Charities based in Australia
Charities based in the United States
International volunteer organizations